The Houston Astros' 2008 season was the 47th season for the Houston Astros. The Astros attempted to return to the postseason, after missing the past two postseasons. This was the last season where the Astros finished the season above the .500 mark prior to the post season run in 2015.

Off Season
On October 29, all six eligible Astros players filed for free agency. The list includes catcher Brad Ausmus, infielder Mike Lamb, infielder Mark Loretta, outfielder Orlando Palmeiro, left-handed reliever Trever Miller and right-handed reliever Brian Moehler.

On October 30, the Astros signed catcher Brad Ausmus to a 1-year, $2 million contract.

On November 8, The Astros acquired outfielder Michael Bourn, third baseman Michael Costanzo, and right-handed reliever Geoff Geary from the Philadelphia Phillies in exchange for right-handed pitcher Brad Lidge and infielder Eric Bruntlett. The announcement was made by Astros General Manager Ed Wade.

On November 16, the Astros acquired right-handed reliever Óscar Villarreal from the Atlanta Braves in exchange for center fielder Josh Anderson. On the same day, the Astros also signed outfielder Yordany Ramirez as a free agent.

On November 20, the Astros signed free agent utilityman Geoff Blum to a one-year deal including a club option for a second year.

On November 26, the Astros signed free agent relief pitcher Doug Brocail to a one-year deal.

On November 30, the Astros and free agent Kazuo Matsui agreed to a 3-year, $16.5 million deal. Matsui played second base for the NL Champion Colorado Rockies in the 2007 season.

On December 12, the Astros acquired shortstop Miguel Tejada from the Orioles for five players. The Astros traded outfielder Luke Scott, pitchers Matt Albers, Troy Patton and Dennis Sarfate and third baseman Mike Costanzo to Baltimore for Tejada. Adam Everett, the Astros shortstop at the time, had to deal with a double-whammy: not only did the Astros trade for Tejada, they also non-tendered Everett, leaving him without a team as of 11 p.m. CT.

On December 14, The Houston Astros' offseason of dealing continued on Friday when the club traded Chris Burke, Chad Qualls and Juan Gutiérrez to the Arizona Diamondbacks in exchange for closer José Valverde.

In January, Brandon Backe, Ty Wigginton, and Dave Borkowski were signed to a one-year contract.

On February 20, Shawn Chacón signed a one-year deal.

On March 29, the Astros released Woody Williams.

On March 30, the contracts of OF José Cruz Jr. and RHP Brian Moehler were purchased from Triple-A Round Rock.

Spring training

In spring training the Astros posted a 13–18 record culminating with a 9–4 win in the final spring training game at Minute Maid Park.

Regular season

March/April
After losing the first two games of the 2008 campaign, the Astros were trailing 6-5 in the top of the 9th with 2 outs of game 3 against Trevor Hoffman, on April 2. The Astros put two on base when Hunter Pence hit a line drive off of Adrián González's glove into right to tie it up. Lance Berkman came up next and smashed a 3-run home run to deep center making it a 9–6 game. Valverde then closed out the Astros first '08 win.

Season standings

Record vs. opponents

Roster

Game log

 † = Interleague Game
All games, dates and times are subject to change

|- align="center" bgcolor="ffbbbb"
| 1 || March 31 || @ Padres || 0–4 || Peavy (1–0) || Oswalt (0–1) || || 44,965 || 0–1 || 
|-

|- align="center" bgcolor="ffbbbb"
| 2 || April 1 || @ Padres || 1–2 || Young (1–0) || Backe (0–1) || Hoffman (1)|| 20,825  || 0–2 || 
|- align="center" bgcolor="bbffbb"
| 3 || April 2 || @ Padres || 9–6 || Valverde (1–0) || Hoffman (0–1) || || 18,714 || 1–2 || 
|- align="center" bgcolor="ffbbbb"
| 4 || April 3 || @ Padres || 2–3 || E. González (1–0) || Villareal (0–1) || Hoffman (2) || 24,432 || 1–3 || 
|- align="center" bgcolor="bbffbb"
| 5 || April 4 || @ Cubs || 4–3 || Wright (1–0) || Lieber (0–1) || Valverde (1) || 37,812 || 2–3 || 
|- align="center" bgcolor="ffbbbb"
| 6 || April 5 || @ Cubs || 7–9 || Hart (1–0) || Oswalt (0–2) || Wood (2) || 40,707 || 2–4 || 
|- align="center" bgcolor="ffbbbb"
| 7 || April 6 || @ Cubs || 2–3 || Zambrano (1–0) || Villarreal (0–2) || Wood (3) || 40,929 || 2–5 || 
|- align="center" bgcolor="bbffbb"
| 8 || April 7 || Cardinals || 5–3 || Valverde (2–0) || McClellan (0–1) || || 43,483 || 3–5 || 
|- align="center" bgcolor="ffbbbb"
| 9 || April 8 || Cardinals || 3–5 || Reyes (1–0) || Geary (0–1) || Isringhausen (4) || 30,184 || 3–6 || 
|- align="center" bgcolor="ffbbbb"
| 10 || April 9 || Cardinals || 4–6 || Looper (2–0) || Sampson (0–1) || Isringhausen (5) || 29,187 || 3–7 || 
|- align="center" bgcolor="ffbbbb"
| 11 || April 11 || Marlins || 6–10 || Nolasco (1–0) || Oswalt (0–3) || || 34,191 || 3–8 ||  
|- align="center" bgcolor="bbffbb" 
| 12 || April 12 || Marlins || 5–0 || Backe (1–1) || Miller (0–2) || || 34,336 || 4–8 || 
|- align="center" bgcolor="bbffbb"
| 13 || April 13 || Marlins || 5–1 || Rodríguez (1–0) || Badenhop (0–1) || || 29,766 || 5–8 || 
|- align="center" bgcolor="ffbbbb"
| 14 || April 15 || @ Phillies || 3–4 || Seánez (1–1) || Valverde (2–1) || || 34,609 || 5–9 || 
|- align="center" bgcolor="bbffbb"
| 15 || April 16 || @ Phillies || 2–1 || Oswalt (1–3) || Kendrick (1–2) || Brocail (1) || 31,644 || 6–9 || 
|- align="center" bgcolor="ffbbbb"
| 16 || April 17 || @ Phillies || 2–10 || Myers (2–1) || Backe (1–2) || || 33,526 || 6–10 || 
|- align="center" bgcolor="ffbbbb"
| 17 || April 18 || Rockies || 11–5 || Morales (1–1) || Sampson (0–2) || || 34,272 || 6–11 || 
|- align="center" bgcolor="ffbbbb"
| 18 || April 19 || Rockies || 2–3 || Cook (2–1) || Villarreal (0–3) || Corpas (4) || 34,540 || 6–12 || 
|- align="center" bgcolor="bbffbb"
| 19 || April 20 || Rockies || 6–4 || Wright (2–0) || Fuentes (0–1) || Valverde (2) || 35,286 || 7–12 || 
|- align="center" bgcolor="bbffbb"
| 20 || April 21 || Padres || 10–3 || Oswalt (2–3) || Germano (0–2) || || 28,600 || 8–12 || 
|- align="center" bgcolor="bbffbb"
| 21 || April 22 || Padres || 11–7 || Valverde (3–1) || Bell (0–2) || || 33,434 || 9–12 || 
|- align="center" bgcolor="bbffbb"
| 22 || April 23 || @ Reds || 9–3 || Sampson (1–2) || Arroyo (0–3) || || 16,017 || 10–12 || 
|- align="center" bgcolor="bbffbb"
| 23 || April 24 || @ Reds || 5–3 || Cassel (1–0) || Cueto (3) || Valverde (3) || 17,403 || 11–12 || 
|- align="center" bgcolor="bbffbb"
| 24 || April 25 || @ Cardinals || 3–2 || Wright (2–0) || Isringhausen (1–2) || Valverde (4) || 41,193 || 12–12 || 
|- align="center" bgcolor="ffbbbb"
| 25 || April 26 || @ Cardinals || 3–4 || Wainwright (3–1) || Borkowski (0–1) || || 43,040 || 12–13 || 
|- align="center" bgcolor="ffbbbb"
| 26 || April 27 || @ Cardinals || 1–5 || Lohse (3–0) || Backe (1–3) || McClellan (1) || 44,222 || 12–14 || 
|- align="center" bgcolor="ffbbbb"
| 27 || April 28 || @ D-backs || 3–5 || Haren (4–1) || Sampson (1–3) || Lyon (8) || 19,868 || 12–15 || 
|- align="center" bgcolor="bbffbb"
| 28 || April 29 || @ D-backs || 6–4 || Brocail (1–0) || González (1–2) || Valverde (5) || 20,241 || 13–15 || 
|- align="center" bgcolor="ffbbbb"
| 29 || April 30 || @ D-backs || 7–8 || Medders (1–0) || Borkowski (0–2) || Lyon (9) || 21,519 || 13–16 || 
|-

|- align="center" bgcolor="bbffbb"
| 30 || May 2 || Brewers || 7–4 || Oswalt (3–3) || Villanueva (1–3) || Valverde (6) || 39,715 || 14–16
|- align="center" bgcolor="bbffbb"
| 31 || May 3 || Brewers || 6–2 ||  Backe (2–3)  || Parra (1–2) ||  || 35,002 || 15–16
|- align="center" bgcolor="bbffbb"
| 32 || May 4 || Brewers || 8 – 6 (12) || Byrdak (1–0) || Stetter (1–1) ||  || 38,301 || 16–16
|- align="center" bgcolor="bbffbb"
| 33 || May 6 || Nationals || 6–5 || Brocail (2–0) || Ayala (1–2) || Valverde (7) || 30,335 || 17–16
|- align="center" bgcolor="bbffbb"
| 34 || May 7 || Nationals || 4–3 || Valverde (4–1) || Hanrahan (0–2) || || 30,432 || 18–16
|- align="center" bgcolor="#ffbbbb"
| 35 || May 8 || Nationals || 8–3 || Lannan (3–3) || Backe (2–4) || || 33,433 || 18–17
|- align="center" bgcolor="bbffbb"
| 36 || May 9 || @ Dodgers || 7–1 || Moehler (1–0)|| Lowe (2–3) || || 52,658 || 19–17
|- align="center" bgcolor="bbffbb"
| 37 || May 10 || @ Dodgers || 5–0 || Sampson (2–3) || Billingsley (2–5) || || 45,212 || 20–17
|- align="center" bgcolor="bbffbb"
| 38 || May 11 || @ Dodgers || 8–5 || Geary (1–1) || Broxton (1–1) || Valverde (8) || 40,217 || 21–17
|- align="center" bgcolor="bbffbb"
| 39 || May 12 || @ Giants || 7–3 || Oswalt (4–3)|| Chulk (0–1) || Valderde (9) || 30,165 || 22–17
|- align="center" bgcolor="#ffbbbb"
| 40 || May 13 || @ Giants || 4–2 || Cain (2–3) || Backe (2–5) || Wilson (12) || 30,858|| 22–18
|- align="center" bgcolor="bbffbb"
| 41 || May 14 || @ Giants || 6–3 || Villarreal (1–3) || Taschner (2–1)  || Valverde (10) || 33,070 || 23–18
|- align="center" bgcolor="bbffbb"
| 42 || May 15 || @ Giants || 8–7 || Byrdak (2–0) || Chulk (0–2) || Valverde (11) || 33,771|| 24–18
|- align="center" bgcolor="#ffbbbb"
| 43 || May 16 || @ Rangers † || 16–8 || Wright (2–1) || Wright (3–1) || || 32,117 || 24–19
|- align="center" bgcolor="#ffbbbb"
| 44 || May 17 || @ Rangers† || 6–2 || Padilla (6–2) || Oswalt (4–4) || || 38,534 || 24–20
|- align="center" bgcolor="bbffbb"
| 45 || May 18 || @ Rangers† || 5–4 || Backe (2–5) || Gabbard (1–1) || Valverde (11) || 33,561 || 25–20
|- align="center" bgcolor="ffbbbb"
| 46 || May 19 || Cubs || 7–2 || Lilly (5–4) || Moehler (1–1) || || 32,458 || 25–21
|- align="center" bgcolor="bbffbb"
| 47 || May 20 || Cubs || 4–2 || Sampson (3–3) || Dempster (5–2) || Valverde (13) || 33,339 || 26–21
|- align="center" bgcolor="bbffbb"
| 48 || May 21 || Cubs || 5–3 || Chacón (1–0) || Gallagher (1–1) || ||33,251 || 27–21
|- align="center" bgcolor="ffbbbb"
| 49 || May 22 || Phillies || 7–5 || Durbin (1–1) || Wright (3–2) || Lidge (12) || 29,263 || 27–22
|- align="center" bgcolor="bbffbb"
| 50 || May 23 || Phillies || 4–3 || Backe (3–5) || Eaton (0–3) ||  Valverde (12) || 41,152 || 28–22 
|- align="center" bgcolor="bbffbb"
| 51 || May 24 || Phillies || 4–3 || Moehler (2–1) || Myers (2–6) || Brocail (2) || 42,660 || 29–22
|- align="center" bgcolor="ffbbbb"
| 52 || May 25 || Phillies || 6–15 || Seánez (3–3) || Nieve (0–1) || || 43,079 || 29–23
|- align="center" bgcolor="bbffbb"
| 53 || May 27 || @ Cardinals || 8–2 || Chacón (1–0) || Looper (6–4) || || 41,104 || 30–23
|- align="center" bgcolor="ffbbbb"
| 54 || May 28 || @ Cardinals || 1–6 || Wainwright (5–2) || Rodríguez (1–1) || || 41,114 || 30–24
|- align="center" bgcolor="ffbbbb"
| 55 || May 29 || @ Cardinals || 2–3 || Lohse (5–2) || Oswalt (4–5) || Franklin (4) || 41,786 || 30–25
|- align="center" bgcolor="ffbbbb"
| 56 || May 30 || @ Brewers || 5–1 || Parra (3–2) || Backe (4–6) || || 32,039 || 30–26
|- align="center" bgcolor="ffbbbb"
| 57 || May 31 || @ Brewers || 4–1 || Sheets (6–1) || Moehler (2–2) || Torres (5) || 42,913 || 30–27
|-

|- align="center" bgcolor="ffbbbb"
| 58 || June 1 || @ Brewers || 10–1 || Bush (2–5) || Chacón (2–1) || || 44,613 || 30–28
|- align="center" bgcolor="bbffbb"
| 59 || June 3 || @ Pirates || 2–0 || Rodríguez (2–1) || Dumatrait (2–3) || Valverde (16) || 13,183 || 31–28
|- align="center" bgcolor="ffbbbb"
| 60 || June 4 || @ Pirates || 5–2 || Duke (3–4) || Oswalt (4–6) || Capps (12) || 9,392 || 31–29
|- align="center" bgcolor="ffbbbb"
| 61 || June 5 || @ Pirates || 4–3 || Maholm (4–5) || Backe (4–7) || Capps (13) || 10,728 || 31–30
|- align="center" bgcolor="bbffbb"
| 62 || June 6 || Cardinals || 6–1 || Moehler (3–2) || Looper (7–5) || || 38,596 || 32–30
|- align="center" bgcolor="ffbbbb"
| 63 || June 7 || Cardinals || 8–4 || Wainwright (6–3) || Chacón (2–2) || || 39,811 || 32–31
|- align="center" bgcolor="ffbbbb"
| 64 || June 8 || Cardinals || 5–4 || Lohse (7–2) || Rodríguez (2–2) || Franklin (8) || 39,923 || 32–32
|- align="center" bgcolor="bbffbb"
| 65 || June 10 || Brewers || 6–1 || Oswalt (5–6) || McClung (3–3) || || 35,058 || 33–32
|- align="center" bgcolor="ffbbbb"
| 66 || June 11 || Brewers || 10–6 || Parra (5–2)  || Backe (4–8) || || 33,806 || 33–33
|- align="center" bgcolor="ffbbbb"
| 67 || June 12 || Brewers || 9–6 || Sheets (7–1) || Moehler (3–3) || || 35,709 || 33–34
|- align="center" bgcolor="ffbbbb"
| 68 || June 13 || Yankees† || 2–1 || Veras (1–0) || Brocail (2–1) || Farnsworth (1) || 43,095 || 33–35
|- align="center" bgcolor="ffbbbb"
| 69 || June 14 || Yankees† || 8–4 || Mussina (10–4) || Rodríguez (2–3) || || 43,409 || 33–36
|- align="center" bgcolor="ffbbbb"
| 70 || June 15 || Yankees† || 13–0 || Wang (8–2) || Oswalt (5–7) || || 43,165 || 33–37
|- align="center" bgcolor="ffbbbb"
| 71 || June 17 || @ Orioles† || 6–5  || Johnson (2–2) || Brocail (2–2) || Sherrill (23) || 21,535 || 33–38
|- align="center" bgcolor="ffbbbb"
| 72 || June 18 || @ Orioles† || 2 – 1 (10) || Bradford (3–2) || Valverde (4–2) || || 21,112 || 33–39
|- align="center" bgcolor="ffbbbb"
| 73 || June 19 || @ Orioles† || 7–5 || Burres (6–5) || Chacón (2–3) || Sherrill (24) || 31,480 || 33–40
|- align="center" bgcolor="bbffbb"
| 74 || June 20 || @ Rays† || 4–3 || Oswalt (6–7) || Garza (5–4) || Valverde (17) || 14,741 || 34–40 
|- align="center" bgcolor="ffbbbb"
| 75 || June 21 || @ Rays† || 4–3 || Wheeler (2–3) || Brocail (2–3) || || 29,953 || 34–41 
|- align="center" bgcolor="bbffbb"
| 76 || June 22 || @ Rays† || 3–2 || Backe (5–8) || Kazmir (6–3) || Valverde (18) || 19,778 || 35–41
|- align="center" bgcolor="bbffbb"
| 77 || June 24 || Rangers† || 4–3 || Moehler (4–3) || Hurley (0–1) || Valverde (19) || 40,052 || 36–41
|- align="center" bgcolor="ffbbbb"
| 78 || June 25 || Rangers† || 3–2 || Mendoza (1–2) || Oswalt (6–8) || Wilson (16) || 32,567 || 36–42
|- align="center" bgcolor="bbffbb"
| 79 || June 26 || Rangers† || 7–2 || Rodríguez (3–3) || Millwood (5–4) || || 36,506 || 37–42
|- align="center" bgcolor="ffbbbb"
| 80 || June 27 || Red Sox† || 6–1 || Matsuzaka (9–1) || Hernández (0–1) || Papelbon (24) || 42,327 || 37–43
|- align="center" bgcolor="bbffbb"
| 81 || June 28 || Red Sox† || 11–10 || Brocail (3–3) || Delcarmen (0–2) || Valverde (20) || 43,073 || 38–43
|- align="center" bgcolor="bbffbb"
| 82 || June 29 || Red Sox† || 3–2 || Brocail (4–3) || Aardsma (2–2) || Valverde (21) || 42,066 || 39–43
|- align="center" bgcolor="bbffbb"
| 83 || June 30 || Dodgers || 4–1 || Oswalt (7–8) || Stults (2–1) || Valverde (22) || 28,827 || 40–44
|-

|- align="center" bgcolor="ffbbbb"
| 84 || July 1 || Dodgers || 7 – 6 (11) || Park (4–2) || Wright (3–3) || Saito (13) || 31,914 || 40–44
|- align="center" bgcolor="ffbbbb"
| 85 || July 2 || Dodgers || 4–1 || Kuroda (4–6) || Hernández (0–2) || || 34,058 || 40–45
|- align="center" bgcolor="ffbbbb"
| 86 || July 3 || Dodgers || 5–2 || Billingsley (8–7) || Backe (5–9) || Saito (14) || 35,696 || 40–46
|- align="center" bgcolor="ffbbbb"
| 87 || July 4 || @ Braves || 6–2 || Hudson (9–6) || Moehler (4–4) || || 48,045 || 40–47
|- align="center" bgcolor="bbffbb"
| 88 || July 5 || @ Braves || 6–1 || Sampson (4–3) || Reyes (3–7) || || 37,049 || 41–47
|- align="center" bgcolor="ffbbbb"
| 89 || July 6 || @ Braves || 7 – 6 (17) || Ring (2–1) || Byrdak (2–1) || || 24,169 || 41–48
|- align="center" bgcolor="ffbbbb"
| 90 || July 7 || @ Pirates || 10–7 || Bautista (2–2) || Hernández (0–3) || Marte (2) || 13,323 ||41–49
|- align="center" bgcolor="ffbbbb"
| 91 || July 8 || @ Pirates || 4–3 || Grabow (5–2) || Brocail (4–4) || Marte (3) || 17,867 || 41–50
|- align="center" bgcolor="bbffbb"
| 92 || July 9 || @ Pirates || 6–4 || Moehler (5–4) || Burnett (0–1) || Valverde (23) || 13,884 || 42–50
|- align="center" bgcolor="ffbbbb"
| 93 || July 11 || @ Nationals || 10–0 || Redding (7–3) || Paronto (0–1) || Shell (1) || 33,653 || 42–51
|- align="center" bgcolor="bbffbb"
| 94 || July 12 || @ Nationals || 6–4 || Rodríguez (4–3) || Balester (1–2) || Valverde (24) || 30,682 || 43–51
|- align="center" bgcolor="bbffbb"
| 95 || July 13 || @ Nationals || 5–0 || Backe (6–9) || Pérez (2–7) || || 31,463 || 44–51
|- align="center" bgcolor="bbffbb"
| 96 || July 18 || Cubs || 2–1 || Geary (2–1) || Howry (3–3) || || 42,368 || 45–51
|- align="center" bgcolor="bbffbb"
| 97 || July 19 || Cubs || 4–1 || Rodríguez (5–3) || Zambrano (10–4) || Valverde (25) || 43,129 || 46–51
|- align="center" bgcolor="ffbbbb"
| 98 || July 20 || Cubs || 9–0 || Dempster (11–4) || Backe (6–10) || || 41,161 || 46–52
|- align="center" bgcolor="ffbbbb"
| 99 || July 21 || Pirates || 9–2 || Valverde (4–3) || Yates (4–2) || || 34,624 || 46–53
|- align="center" bgcolor="ffbbbb"
| 100 || July 22 || Pirates || 8–2 || Maholm (7–6) || Cassel (1–1) || || 33,996 || 46–54
|- align="center" bgcolor="ffbbbb"
| 101 || July 23 || Pirates || 8–7 || Osoria (4–3) || Geary (2–2) || Marte (5) || 36,091 || 46–55
|- align="center" bgcolor="bbffbb"
| 102 || July 25 || @ Brewers || 3–1 || Rodríguez (6–3) || Parra (9–3) || Valverde (26) || 41,357 || 47–55
|- align="center" bgcolor="ffbbbb"
| 103 || July 26 || @ Brewers || 6–4 || Gagné (4–2) || Brocail (4–5) || Torres (20) || 43,489 || 47–56
|- align="center" bgcolor="bbffbb"
| 104 || July 27 || @ Brewers || 11–6 || Sampson (5–3) || Suppan (5–7) || || 31,565 || 48–56
|- align="center" bgcolor="bbffbb"
| 105 || July 28 || Reds || 5–4 || Oswalt (8–8) || Cueto (7–10) || Valverde (27) || 31,783 || 49–56
|- align="center" bgcolor="bbffbb"
| 106 || July 29 || Reds || 6–2 || Moehler (6–4) || Arroyo (9–8) || Wright (1) || 34,015 || 50–56
|- align="center" bgcolor="ffbbbb"
| 107 || July 30 || Reds || 9–5 || Vólquez (13–4) || Rodríguez (6–4) || || 30,272 || 50–57
|-

|- align="center" bgcolor="bbffbb"
| 108 || August 1 || Mets || 7–3 || Brocail (5–5) || Heilman (1–5) || || 41,083 || 51–57
|- align="center" bgcolor="bbffbb"
| 109 || August 2 || Mets || 5–4 || Valverde (5–3) || Heilman (1–6) || || 39,152 || 52–57
|- align="center" bgcolor="bbffbb"
| 110 || August 3 || Mets || 4–0 || Wolf (7–10) || Pérez (7–7) || || 38,602 || 53–57
|- align="center" bgcolor="bbffbb"
| 111 || August 4 || @ Cubs || 2 – 0 (8) || Moehler (7–4) || Dempster (12–5) || Hawkins (1) || 40,867 || 54–57
|- align="center" bgcolor="ffbbbb"
| 112 || August 5 || @ Cubs || 11–7 || Howry (4–4) || Sampson (5–4) || || 40,416 || 54–58
|- align="center" bgcolor="ffbbbb"
| 113 || August 6 || @ Cubs || 11–4 || Marquis (7–7) || Backe (6–11) || || 41,107 || 54–59
|- align="center" bgcolor="bbffbb"
| 114 || August 7 || @ Reds || 7–4 || Oswalt (9–8) || Fogg (2–4) || || 27,378 || 55–59
|- align="center" bgcolor="bbffbb"
| 115 || August 8 || @ Reds || 9 – 5 (10) || Sampson (6–4) || Cordero (4–4) || || 25,652 || 56–59
|- align="center" bgcolor="bbffbb"
| 116 || August 9 || @ Reds || 3–1 || Moehler (8–4) || Arroyo (10–9) || Valverde (28) || 26,044 || 57–59
|- align="center" bgcolor="bbffbb"
| 117 || August 10 || @ Reds || 13–4 || Rodríguez (7–4) || Harang (3–12) || || 30,789 || 58–59
|- align="center"  bgcolor="bbffbb"
| 118 || August 11 || Giants || 3–1 || Backe (7–11) || Sánchez (8–9) || Valverde (29) || 28,220 || 59–59
|- align="center"  bgcolor="bbffbb"
| 118 || August 12 || Giants || 12–4 || Oswalt (10–8) || Walker (4–7) || || 29,451 || 60–59
|- align="center" bgcolor="bbffbb"
| 120 || August 13 || Giants || 6–2 || Wolf (8–10) || Zito (6–15) || || 30,330 || 61–59
|- align="center" bgcolor="bbffbb"
| 121 || August 14 || Giants || 7–4 || Hawkins (2–1) || Yabu (3–5) || Valverde (30) || 33,612 || 62–59
|- align="center" bgcolor="ffbbbb"
| 122 || August 15 || Diamondbacks || 12–2 || Webb (18–4) || Rodríguez (7–5) || || 36,035 || 62–60
|- align="center" bgcolor="ffbbbb"
| 123 || August 16 || Diamondbacks || 11–5 || Petit (2–3) || Backe (7–12) || || 33,612 || 62–61
|- align="center" bgcolor="bbffbb"
| 124 || August 17 || Diamondbacks || 3–0 || Oswalt (11–8) || Johnson (10–9) || Valverde (31) || 42,619 || 63–61
|- align="center" bgcolor="ffbbbb"
| 125 || August 18 || @ Brewers || 9–3 || Sabathia (14–8) || Wolf (8–11) ||  || 41,991 || 63–62
|- align="center" bgcolor="bbffbb"
| 126 || August 19 || @ Brewers || 5–2 || Moehler (9–4) || Sheets (11–7) || Valverde (32) || 41,662 || 64–62
|- align="center" bgcolor="ffbbbb"
| 127 || August 20 || @ Brewers || 5–2 || Parra (10–6) || Rodríguez (7–6) || Torres (24) || 41,419 || 64–63
|- align="center" bgcolor="ffbbbb"
| 128 || August 22 || @ Mets || 5–2 || Santana (12–7) || Oswalt (11–9) || Ayala (1) || 52,008 || 64–64
|- align="center" bgcolor="bbffbb"
| 129 || August 23 || @ Mets || 8–3 || Backe (8–12) || Maine (10–8) || || 51,766 || 65–64
|- align="center" bgcolor="bbffbb"
| 130 || August 24 || @ Mets || 6–4 || Hawkins (3–1) || Feliciano (2–4) || Valverde (33) || 49,758 || 66–64
|- align="center" bgcolor="ffbbbb"
| 131 || August 25 || @ Mets || 9–1 || Pelfrey (13–8) || Moehler (9–5) || || 41,419 || 66–65
|- align="center" bgcolor="ffbbbb"
| 132 || August 26 || Reds || 2–1 || Arroyo (12–10) || Geary (2–3) || || 30,395 || 66–66
|- align="center" bgcolor="bbffbb"
| 133 || August 27 || Reds || 4–1 || Oswalt (12–9) || Fogg (2–7) || Valverde (34) || 30,741 || 67–66
|- align="center" bgcolor="bbffbb"
| 134 || August 28 || Reds || 3–2 || Backe (9–12) || Harang (4–14) || Valverde (35) || 30,028 || 68–66
|- align="center" bgcolor="bbffbb"
| 135 || August 29 || Cardinals || 3–2 || Brocail (6–5) || Springer (2–1) || || 33,347 || 69–66
|- align="center" bgcolor="bbffbb"
| 136 || August 30 || Cardinals || 8–5 || Moehler (10–5) || Looper (12–11) || Valverde (36) || 37,569 || 70–66
|- align="center" bgcolor="bbffbb"
| 137 || August 31 || Cardinals || 3–0 || Rodríguez (8–6) || Wellemeyer (11–6) || Valverde (37) || 35,638 || 71–66
|-

|- align="center" bgcolor="bbffbb"
| 138 || September 1 || @ Cubs || 3–0 || Oswalt (13–9) || Marquis (9–8) || Valverde (38) || 40,670 || 72–66
|- align="center" bgcolor="bbffbb"
| 139 || September 2 || @ Cubs || 9–7 || Wright (8–6) || Wood (4–3) || Valverde (39) || 39,846 || 73–66
|- align="center" bgcolor="bbffbb"
| 140 || September 3 || @ Cubs || 4–0 || Wolf (9–11) || Dempster (15–6) || || 40,163 || 74–66
|- align="center" bgcolor="ffbbbb"
| 141 || September 5 || @ Rockies || 5–3 || Jiménez (10–12) || Moehler (10–6) || Fuentes (27) || 26,163 || 74–67
|- align="center" bgcolor="bbffbb"
| 142 || September 6 || @ Rockies || 2–0 || Oswalt (14–9) || Francis (4–9) || || 32,352 || 75–67
|- align="center" bgcolor="bbffbb"
| 143 || September 7 || @ Rockies || 7–5 || Brocail (7–5) || Buchholz (6–5) || Valverde (40) || 30,509 || 76–67
|- align="center" bgcolor="bbffbb"
| 144 || September 8 || Pirates || 3–2 || Arias (1–0) || Snell (6–11) || Valverde (41) || 26,526 || 77–67
|- align="center" bgcolor="bbffbb"
| 145 || September 9 || Pirates || 9–3 || Wolf (10–11) || Ohlendorf (1–2) || || 30,034 || 78–67
|- align="center" bgcolor="bbffbb"
| 146 || September 10 || Pirates || 7–4 || Moehler (11–6) || Bautista (4–4) || Valverde (42) || 26,859 || 79–67
|- align="center" bgcolor="bbffbb"
| 147 || September 11 || Pirates || 6–0 || Oswalt (15–9) || Duke (5–14) || || 31,101 || 80–67
|- align="center" bgcolor="#e0e0e0"
| – || September 12 || Cubs || colspan=8|Postponed (Hurricane Ike) Rescheduled for September 14 @ Miller Park.
|- align="center" bgcolor="#e0e0e0"
| – || September 13 || Cubs || colspan=8|Postponed (Hurricane Ike) Rescheduled for September 15 @ Miller Park.
|- align="center" bgcolor="#e0e0e0"
| – || September 14 || Cubs || colspan=8|Postponed (Hurricane Ike) Cancelled due to the Astros being eliminated from the Playoff Contention. 
|- align="center" bgcolor="ffbbbb"
| 148 || September 14 || Cubs* || 5–0 || Zambrano (14–5) || Wolf (10–12) || || 23,441 || 80–68
|- align="center" bgcolor="ffbbbb"
| 149 || September 15 || Cubs* || 6–1 || Lilly (15–9) || Moehler (11–7) || || 15,158 || 80–69
|- align="center" bgcolor="ffbbbb"
| 150 || September 16 || @ Marlins || 5–1 || Volstad (5–3) || Oswalt (15–10) || || 12,232 || 80–70
|- align="center" bgcolor="ffbbbb"
| 151 || September 17 || @ Marlins || 2–14 || Nolasco (15–7) || Backe (9–13) || || 14,124 || 80–71
|- align="center" bgcolor="ffbbbb"
| 152 || September 18 || @ Marlins || 1-8 || Olsen (8-10) || Arias (1-1) || || 14,219 || 80-72
|- align="center" bgcolor="bbffbb"
| 153 || September 19 || @ Pirates || 5-1 || Wolf (11-12) || Snell (6-12) || || 26,301 || 81-72
|- align="center" bgcolor="ffbbbb"
| 154 || September 20 || @ Pirates || 4-6 || Davis (2-4) || Brian Moehler (11-8) || Capps (20) || 36,621 || 81-73
|- align="center" bgcolor="bbffbb"
| 155 || September 21 || @ Pirates || 6-2 || Oswalt (16-10) || Ohlendorf (1-4) || || 20,311 || 82-73
|- align="center" bgcolor="ffbbbb"
| 156 || September 23 || Reds || 2-1 || Volquez (17-6) || Rodríguez (8–7) || Cordero (34) || 27,561 || 82-74
|- align="center" bgcolor="bbffbb"
| 157 || September 24 || Reds || 5-0 || Wolf (12-12) || Ramírez (1–1) || || 26,103 || 83-74
|- align="center" bgcolor="bbffbb"
| 158 || September 25 || Reds || 8-7 || Oswalt (17-10) || Cueto (9-14) || José Valverde (43) || 31,204 || 84-74
|- align="center" bgcolor="bbffbb"
| 159 || September 26 || Braves || 5-4 || José Valverde (6-3) || Tavárez (1-5) || || 33,477 || 85-74 
|- align="center" bgcolor="ffbbbb"
| 160 || September 27 || Braves || 5-11 || Vladimir Núñez (1-2) || Backe (9-14) || || 37,491 || 85-75
|- align="center" bgcolor="bbffbb"
| 161 || September 28 || Braves || 3-1 || Rodríguez (9-7) || Hampton (3-4) || José Valverde (44) || 37,113 || 86-75
|-

|*At Miller Park in Milwaukee, Wisconsin

Player stats

Batting

Starters by position
Note: Pos = Position; G = Games played; AB = At bats; H = Hits; Avg. = Batting average; HR = Home runs; RBI = Runs batted in

Other batters
Note: G = Games played; AB = At bats; H = Hits; Avg. = Batting average; HR = Home runs; RBI = Runs batted in

Pitching

Starting pitchers
Note: G = Games pitched; IP = Innings pitched; W = Wins; L = Losses; ERA = Earned run average; SO = Strikeouts

Other pitchers
Note: G = Games pitched; IP = Innings pitched; W = Wins; L = Losses; ERA = Earned run average; SO = Strikeouts

Relief pitchers
Note: G = Games pitched; W = Wins; L = Losses; SV = Saves; ERA = Earned run average; SO = Strikeouts

Farm system

References

External links
Houston Astros Official Website
Houston Astros Tentative Schedule
2008 Houston Astros season at Baseball Reference

Houston Astros seasons
Houston Astros season
2008 in sports in Texas